Schefflera tetrandra is a species of flowering plant in the family Araliaceae and is endemic to Borneo.

References 

tetrandra
Flora of Borneo